Kevin Goden (born 22 February 1999) is a German professional footballer who plays as a defender for 1860 Munich II.

Career
Goden made his professional debut for 1. FC Köln on 19 December 2017, coming on as a substitute for Chris Führich in the 2017–18 DFB-Pokal round of 16 away match against Schalke 04.

In May 2018, 1. FC Nürnberg announced Goden would join the club for the 2018–19 season.

In September 2019, Goden joined Eintracht Braunschweig on a season-long loan deal.

References

1999 births
Living people
Sportspeople from Bonn
German footballers
Footballers from North Rhine-Westphalia
Association football defenders
Germany youth international footballers
Bundesliga players
3. Liga players
Regionalliga players
Bayernliga players
1. FC Köln II players
1. FC Köln players
1. FC Nürnberg players
1. FC Nürnberg II players
Eintracht Braunschweig players
TSV 1860 Munich players
TSV 1860 Munich II players